Hauet is a French surname. Notable people with the surname include:

Claude Hauet (1925–1995), French field hockey player
Jean Hauet (1925–1990), French field hockey player

French-language surnames